Realty Income Corporation is a real estate investment trust that invests in free-standing, single-tenant commercial properties in the United States, Spain and the United Kingdom that are subject to NNN Leases. The company is organized in Maryland with its headquarters in San Diego, California.

The company is one of a few real estate investment trusts that pays dividends monthly, rather than quarterly, and has registered a trademark for the phrase "The Monthly Dividend Company".

Investments
As of March 31, 2022, the company owned 11,288 properties totaling approximately 213.9 million leasable square feet, with an average property size of approximately 12,660 square feet per retail property and approximately 244,460 square feet per industrial property.

The company's largest tenants are as follows:

History
Realty Income Corporation was founded in 1969 by William E. Clark and Evelyn J. Clark. Its first acquisition was a Taco Bell restaurant in early 1970.

The company used cash to purchase land needed for stores that required real estate to run, and then leased the property to the stores long term.

In 1994, the company became a public company via an initial public offering.

In 1997, William E. Clark, Jr., retired as CEO and was succeeded by Thomas A. Lewis. In 2013, John P. Case succeeded Mr. Lewis as CEO of the company. In 2009, Clark retired as chairman.

In 2013, the company acquired American Realty Capital Trust, founded by Nicholas Schorsch, in a $2.95 billion transaction.

In 2015, the company was added to the S&P 500 and the S&P High Yield Dividend Aristocrats index.

In 2018, Sumit Roy became the company's CEO.

In 2019, the company completed a sale-leaseback transaction for 12 properties of the United Kingdom supermarket chain Sainsbury's.  This was the company's first purchase of property outside the United States.

On November 1, 2021, the company acquired VEREIT.

References

External links

1969 establishments in California
Companies based in San Diego County, California
Companies listed on the New York Stock Exchange
Real estate companies established in 1969
Real estate investment trusts of the United States